European nationalism (sometimes called pan-European nationalism) is a form of nationalism based on a pan-European identity. It is considered minor since the National Party of Europe disintegrated in the 1970s.

History
The former British Union of Fascists leader, Oswald Mosley, led the Union Movement and advocated its "Europe a Nation" policy from 1948 to 1973. In 1950, Mosley co-founded the European Social Movement and collaborated with comparable groups on the Continent. The organisation was mostly defunct by 1957 and was succeeded by the National Party of Europe, which was formed in 1962 by Mosley and the leaders of the German nationalist Deutsche Reichspartei, the Italian Social Movement, Jeune Europe and the Mouvement d'Action Civique. The movement remained active during the 1960s but was mostly disbanded in the 1970s.

1962 European Declaration
In their "European Declaration" of 1 March 1962, the National Party of Europe called for the creation of a European nation-state through a common European government, an elected European parliament, the withdrawal of American and Soviet forces from Europe and the dissolution of the United Nations, which would be replaced by an international body led by the United States, the Soviet Union and Europe as three equals. The territory of the European state was to be that of all European nations outside the Soviet Union, including the British Isles, and their overseas possessions.

Current situation
In 2014, Raphael Schlembach describes the existence of "a form of pan-European nationalism — a 'Europe for the Europeans' — that is based upon anti-Americanism and ethno-pluralism" within "some sections" of European neo-fascism. Indeed, European nationalist organisations continued to exist on a minor scale after the disintegration of the National Party of Europe in the 1970s, but no group advocates a "European nation state".

According to scholars, former European nationalist groups now propose a European ethnic federalism based on an ideology of "European culturalism" or, according to Dimitri Almeida, underwent a "Eurosceptic turn", the ideology of European nationalism being largely replaced by hard Euroscepticism by the 2010s.

European Parliament
Identity and Democracy grouping is a far-right political group of the European Parliament launched on 13 June 2019 for the Ninth European Parliament. It is composed of nationalist, right-wing populist and eurosceptic national parties from ten European nations. It is the successor to the Europe of Nations and Freedom group, which was formed during the Eighth European Parliament. Its members are the Freedom Party of Austria, Flemish Interest (Belgium), Freedom and Direct Democracy (Czechia), the Danish People's Party, the Conservative People's Party of Estonia, the Finns Party, National Rally (France), Alternative for Germany, Lega Nord (Italy) and the Party for Freedom (Netherlands). Other nationalist parties include the European Conservatives and Reformists (ECR), which also included nationalist, right-wing populist and euroscepticism|eurosceptic national parties from 12 countries.

List of European nationalist organisations
Identitarian Movement · Jeune Europe (Belgium) · Comité de liaison des européens révolutionnaires (France) · Parti Communautaire National-Européen (Belgium) · Nouvelle Droite (France) · Réseau Radical · Bloc Identitaire · Parti Nationaliste Français et Européen (France) · Imperium Europa (Malta) · le parti des européens (France) · Reconquista Europa (Ukraine)

Arendt's warning
Hannah Arendt warned in 1954 that a "pan-European nationalism" might arise from the cultivation of anti-American sentiment in Europe. Her warning has been deemed obsolete by the 1990s:
Gerard Delanty argued, "Europe could never constitute a coherent identity because there is 'no external opposition' to it" (a role foreseen by Arendt as to be taken by America). 
In the opinion of the scholar Anton Speekenbrink in 2014, nationalism was replaced by a "postmodern world order" in the postwar period ("Nationalism was dead, but it was not replaced by pan-European nationalism or by a pan-European identity"). It instead invoked a "European idea", which was said to be transformed into an "idea of diversity of identity" combined with a "commonality of values".

See also
 Eurocentrism
 European integration
 Eurosphere
 European Union
 Fourth Reich
 Identitarianism
 Nativism
 Pan-nationalism
 Paneuropean Union
 Politics of Europe
 Pro-Europeanism
 United States of Europe
 White nationalism
 List of active nationalist parties in Europe

References

 
Nationalism
Nationalist movements in Europe
Europe